Casey Wyatt Miller (born June 17, 1978), known professionally as KC Montero, is an American radio DJ and actor currently based in the Philippines. He is currently the Vice President of Marketing and Head of Content at Kumu.

Personal life
He was born on June 17, 1977. He is the brother of Troy Montero and Colby Miller. He was born to an American father of German and Irish descent and an American-born Filipino mother.
He started his career as an MTV VJ in 1999 after winning the MTV VJ Hunt along with Belinda Panelo.

He was a former host on GMA 7's Sunday variety show SOP (Sobrang Okey Pare) and was seen on Party Pilipinas, Studio 23's Usi. He co-produced and hosted the MTV Pilipinas Video Music Awards 2006 and is a radio personality on the early morning show called "The KC Show" on Wave 891.

He was married to singer-actress Geneva Cruz but now are separated.

He tied the knot with Stephanie Dods on September 9, 2019.

On June 28, 2020, he was arrested for allegedly violating social distancing guidelines for COVID-19 prevention in a Makati bar.

Filmography

Radio
 The KC Show (U92, 2009-2010; Wave 891, 2010-2012)
 The Wildside (Wave 89.1, 2015–2016)
 Good Times (Magic 89.9, 2018–present)

Television
MTV Philippines Shows
 MTV News
 MTV Jams
 MTV Diyes
 Be Seen @ MTV
 MTV Lokal
 MTV Alternative Nation
 MTV Loveline
 World Chart Express
 Pop Inc
 MTV Most Wanted

MTV Specials
 MTV Staying Alive Music Summit for HIV/ AIDS 2006
 MTV Pilipinas Video Music Awards 2006
 MTV's Top 25 Moments
 MTV Staying Alive Music Summit for HIV/ AIDS 2005
 MTV's Top 20 Live Performances of 2005
 MTV Pilipinas Video Music Awards 2005
 MTV Regional VJ Hunt 2005 in Bali, Indonesia
 MTV VJ Hunt 2005
 MTV Asia Aid Red Carpet Special
 MTV Style Awards
 Hula Hoop: MTV Pilipinas 2004 Pre-Show
 MTV Asia Awards Red Carpet Special 2004
 MTV Music Summit 2003
 MTV VJ Hunt 2003
 MTV Asia Awards Red Carpet Special 2003
 MTV Asia Awards Red Carpet Special 2002
 MTV Asia Awards Red Carpet Special 2001

Television
 SOP (Sobrang Okey Pare)
 Eat Bulaga! - Guest
 ASAP Natin 'To (ABS-CBN 2, 2001-2015) 
 Usi (5 Network, 2000)
 Match TV
 Beh! Bote Nga!
 Walang Tulugan with the Master Showman (1997-2016) - Guest
 It's Showtime (2009–present) - Guest/Celerity Jurado
 Party Pilipinas
 Tech Trip
 Survivor Philippines: Celebrity Doubles Showdown
 The G.O.A.T.
 Sunday All Stars
 The Ryzza Mae Show - Guest
 Sunday PinaSaya - Guest
 Tonight with Arnold Clavio - Guest
 Alyas Robin Hood
 Tonight with Boy Abunda - Guest
 Studio 7 (2018–present) - Guest
 Tadhana - Guest
 Dear Uge - Guest
 Mars Pa More (formerly Mars (GMA News TV 27, 2012-2019; GMA 7, 2019-present) - Guest
 Magandang Buhay - Guest
 FPJ's Ang Probinsyano (Lance Mendez) - Guest [2019]
 Lunch Out Loud (TV5, 2020) - Host

Film
 Maria (2019)
 Kubot: The Aswang Chronicles 2 (2014)
 Pakisabi na Lang ay Mahal Ko Siya (2002)
 Ano Bang Meron Ka?! (2001) - KC's Debut Movie

TV specials
 Miss World Philippines 2017
 Miss Universe Philippines 2020

Discography

As featured artist
 "For the Love of You" (with Gabby Eigenmann) (from R2K)

Notes

References

External links
KC Montero feature on MTVAsia.com

Rappers from Washington (state)
1978 births
Living people
VJs (media personalities)
American rappers of Filipino descent
American male pop singers
American emigrants to the Philippines
Survivor Philippines contestants
American male actors of Filipino descent
Male actors from Tacoma, Washington
American radio personalities
21st-century American rappers
West Coast hip hop musicians
ABS-CBN personalities
GMA Network personalities
TV5 (Philippine TV network) personalities
21st-century American male musicians